The 2016 President's Cup is the 66th season of the President's Cup. Maziya Sports and Recreation Club are the defending champions, having beaten New Radiant Sports Club in last season's final.

This is the second tournament under its current tournament format.

Participating teams

Final draw

Venues

Background

Format

The first round, or group stage, was a competition between the 6 teams divided among two groups of three, where each group engaged in a round-robin tournament within itself. The two highest ranked teams in each group advanced to the knockout stage. Teams were awarded three points for a win and one for a draw. When comparing teams in a group over-all result came before head-to-head.

For any match after the group stage, a draw after 90 minutes of regulation time was followed by two 15 minute periods of extra time to determine a winner. If the teams were still tied, a penalty shoot-out was held to determine a winner.

Broadcasting rights
The broadcasting rights for some matches of 2016 Maldives President's Cup are given to the [www.psm.mv/ Public Service Media (PSM)].

Group stage

Group 1

Group 2

Knockout stage

Semi-finals

Final

Statistics

Scorers

Assists

Own goals
  Ali Shaamiu (New Radiant) (playing against Eagles)

References

President's Cup (Maldives)
Pres